Stanhopeinae is a subtribe of plants in the tribe Cymbidieae.

The subtribe in the strict sense, have viscidia and stipes that are thin and strap-like, they are adapted for attachment to edge of the bee's scutellum or to a leg. Pseudobulbs are usually ribbed/four-angled or flattened. Leaves are generally thicker than Coeliopsidinae. Roots are smooth, without prominent root hairs. The column foot is lacking or not distinct. Unpollinated flowers quickly abscise and fall from the inflorescence, unlike members of Coeliopsidinae which include Coeliopsis, Lycomormium, and Peristeria. Stanhopeinae and Coeliopsidinae are now considered closely related sister subtribes.

Within Stanhopeinae the members can be further grouped in six clades based on morphological traits and molecular analysis.
Braemia Clade: Braemia
Gongora Clade: Cirrhaea & Gongora
Acineta Clade: Acineta, Lacaena, Lueddemannia & Vasqueziella
Polycycnis Clade: Kegeliella, Polycycnis & Soterosanthus
Stanhopea Clade: Coryanthes, Embreea, Stanhopea & Sievekingia
Houlletia Clade: Horichia, Houlletia, Jennyella, Paphinia, Schlimia & Trevoria

The genus Archivea is only known by a watercolor painting by T. Duncanson in the herbarium archives of the Royal Botanic Gardens, Kew. No pressed specimens or living material is known, so it can not be grouped into a specific clade.

All species in this subtribe are exclusively pollinated by male euglossine bees, which are attracted to the floral fragrances, and collect them. One orchid species may attract only one or a few species of bees from dozens of species in the habitat.

Genera
Acineta
Braemia
Cirrhaea
Coryanthes
Embreea
Gongora
Horichia
Houlletia
Kegeliella
Lacaena
Lueckelia
Lueddemannia
Paphinia
Polycycnis
Schlimia
Sievekingia
Soterosanthus
Stanhopea
Trevoria
Vasqueziella

In synonymy:
Archivea
Endresiella: see Trevoria
Jennyella
Stanhopeastrum: see Stanhopea

References

Further reading
  (1983): Orchid floral fragrances and male euglossine bees: methods and advances in the last sesquidecade. Biol. Bull. 164: 355-395.
Gerlach, G. (2003)  "The subtribe Stanhopeinae: biology and systematics" - Proceedings of the European Orchid Conference and Show (ed. J. Hermans and P. J. Cribb), pp. 135–142.  Naturalia Publications, Turriers, France.
 W. Mark Whitten, Norris H. Williams and Mark W. Chase Subtribal and generic relationships of Maxillarieae (Orchidaceae) with emphasis on Stanhopeinae: combined molecular evidence, American Journal of Botany. 2000;87:1842-1856

External links
 Botanical Garden Munich: One of the most extensive photo collections of Stanhopeinae.
 The Stanhopea Pages website.

 
Orchid subtribes